Elisabeth "Lisbetha" Olsdotter (died November 1679) was a Swedish woman, who was executed on a number of different charges after having dressed as a man, served as a soldier and married a woman. On 24 October 1679 Svea Hovrätt in Stockholm brought the charges, earlier raised in the court of Långhundra Häradsting.

The trial

Background 
Lisbetha Olsdotter is reported to have been originally from Tysslinge torp in Östuna parish in Långhundra Härad.  She married the village tailor Anders Persson and had children with him: during her trial in 1679, it was reported that she had one surviving child of six years old. 

In 1674, she abandoned her husband because of his adultery and debauched lifestyle, and become a domestic servant to H. Schlangenfeldt in Huvudsta in Stockholm, where she worked for four years.  According to court documents, she was originally advised to dress as a man by her colleague, the soldier's widow, Sara, for the purpose of seducing a vivacious widow, referred to by the names Maria or Walborg.  After this incident, she left her employ and successfully sought employment as a male servant in the household of the country administrator Jon Persson in Alby in Botkyrka under the name Mats Ersson. 

In 1678, her employer was visited by a man with the task to enlist soldiers to the king.  In parallel, the brother of her employer, the master mariner Erik Persson Arnelii, reportedly discovered her gender and persuaded her to enlist as a soldier by threatening to expose her if she did not.  He assisted her in how to enlist, and after having successfully done so, she gave Arnelii some of her salary as in return for his help and silence.

She was present in all the military drills and performed all her duties as a soldier.  In Easter 1679 she married the maid Kerstin Ersdotter in accordance with all customary traditional ceremonies of the church.  After the wedding, however, Kerstin Ersdotter discovered the biological sex of her groom when attempting to have intercourse, and reported Lisbetha Olsdotter to the authorities for fraud.  She was arrested on Norrmalm and put on trial on 5 July 1679.

Charges 
Olsdotter was put on trial for several charges:
Abandonment of husband and children;
Wearing of male clothing, which was forbidden in the Bible, and the crime of secular fraud by pretending to be a man;
Bigamy, as she married when she already had a husband;
Homosexuality, and having ridiculed the holy act of marriage by marrying someone of the same sex;
Theft, after having received salary as a soldier;
Fraud, for taking a profession she was not capable of performing.

Execution 
Olsdotter was judged guilty of the charges under the law of the act of religion from 1655: for having, with full intent, "mutilated" her gender, "mocked God and the Order of God", and fooled authorities and her "fellow Christians" by impersonating a man.  She was sentenced to death by decapitation. The woman she had married, Kerstin Ersdotter, claimed that she had been as fooled as every one else and was therefore judged as a victim of the crime rather than an accomplice to it. 

Sara and Arnelii, who had helped her, were also arrested. The case, however, was so unusual, that the verdict would be confirmed by the highest Royal court in the country first.

The Royal court confirmed the verdict on 12 November, and ordered the priests to clarify for her what sin she had committed in the eyes of religion.  It was decided by the court, that she would go to her execution dressed as a man, but wear female headgear.
She was decapitated on Hötorget in Stockholm in 1679.

From the late 16th century to the early 19th century, there were several known cases in Swedish military history of women dressing and presenting as men, especially in the early 18th century. The most famous case was the one of Ulrika Eleonora Stålhammar in 1728. An unnamed woman, who served in the Great Northern War, was whipped as a punishment, but continued to wear male clothing until the 1740s, when she was known on the streets of Stockholm as "The Rider"; Maria Johansdotter, who was put on trial in Stockholm in 1706 for having dressed as a man and served as a parish clerk, was given a sentence of eight days in jail and then set free. Most of the cases did not lead to execution, as in the case of Lisbetha Olsdotter.

References 

 Liliequist, Jonas (2002). "Kvinnor i manskläder och åtrå mellan kvinnor: kulturella förväntningar och kvinnliga strategier i det tidigmoderna Sverige och Finland”. Makalösa kvinnor (Stockholm, 2002): sid. 93 f.. Libris 9236174  
 Lisbetha Olsdotter i Wilhelmina Stålberg, Anteckningar om svenska qvinnor (1864)  
 Västerbottens-Kuriren 4/2 2003  
 Svenska Familj-Journalen, band 18, årgång 1879  
 glbtq, social sciences, Sweden 
 Anna Ivarsdotter Johnsson och Leif Jonsson : Musiken i Sverige, Frihetstiden och Gustaviansk tid 1720–1810 
 Borgström Eva, red (2002). Makalösa kvinnor: könsöverskridare i myt och verklighet. Stockholm: Alfabeta/Anamma. Libris 8707902.  (inb.)  
 SE/SSA//0144/02/Norra förstadens kämnärsrätt/A1A Protokoll i civil- och kriminalmål/Volym 25/1679/s. 674–678

Further reading 
 

1600s births
1679 deaths
Swedish LGBT people
Swedish soldiers
Executed Swedish people
17th-century Swedish people
People executed by the Swedish Empire
People prosecuted under anti-homosexuality laws
17th-century LGBT people
17th-century soldiers
People executed by Sweden by decapitation
17th-century executions by Sweden
Caroleans
People of the Swedish Empire
Women in 17th-century warfare
Female wartime cross-dressers
Women in war in Sweden